Peter Armitage may refer to:
 Peter Armitage (statistician) (born 1924), British statistician
 Peter Armitage (actor) (1939–2018), English actor
 N. Peter Armitage (born 1971), American physicist